Suregada aequorea is a plant species of the family Euphorbiaceae, endemic to the coastal thickets of Taiwan. It is a shrubs or small tree, growing to about 3 meters in height. Its leaves are elliptic to obovate-oblong, 3.5-9 × 2–3.5 cm in size.

Synonyms 
 Gelonium aequoreum Hance
 Owataria formosana Matsum.

References 

 J. Bot. 4: 403 1866.
 The Plant List entry
 Flora of China entry
 Encyclopedia of Life entry

Crotonoideae